Lauren Townsend may refer to:
Lauren Townsend (footballer) (born 1990), Welsh footballer
Lauren Townsend (Columbine massacre victim), a victim of the Columbine high school massacre